James Love is a Canadian guitarist from British Columbia. From 2010 to 2016, he was a member of the Canadian new wave/synthpop band Men Without Hats.

Musical career

A graduate of the Roberto-Venn School of Luthiery, Love toured as a guitar technician in the road crew of Fenix TX, a Houston pop punk band. He joined the group as a full member in early 2001, replacing Damon DeLaPaz as guitarist after the departure of drummer Donnie Reyes caused DeLaPaz to move to drums. Love played on the band's final studio album, Lechuza, released in May 2001, and after a concert tour, he left the group later the same year.

From 2004 to 2006, Love toured with the Dillinger Escape Plan, and became a member of that band in 2013. Love was also in a Houston-based heavy metal band called Torches of Fury, with whom he recorded the group's self-titled 2006 EP. In Houston, he also formed Golden Axe, a heavy metal duo active from 2005 to 2011.

Love joined Men Without Hats in 2010 as a touring member of the revived 1980s band, and subsequently returned to Canada. The group's leader, Ivan Doroschuk, made Love a full member of the Vancouver-based group, and Love appeared on their 2012 album Love in the Age of War, the first Men Without Hats album in nine years. He was replaced as guitarist in October 2016, several weeks before the band began a European tour.

References

Year of birth missing (living people)
Living people
Canadian rock guitarists
Canadian male guitarists
Men Without Hats members